Commissioned frigates of the Royal New Zealand Navy from its formation on 1 October 1941 to the present:

Class types

frigates

Whitby-class (Type 12) frigates

Rothesay-class (Type 12M) frigates

Leander-class (Type 12I) frigates

Anzac-class frigates

See also
 Current Royal New Zealand Navy ships

References
 Walters, Sydney David (1956) The Royal New Zealand Navy: Official History of World War II, Department of Internal Affairs, Wellington Online
 McDougall, R J  (1989) New Zealand Naval Vessels. Page 37–48. Government Printing Office. 
 Royal New Zealand Navy Official web site

 
Military history of New Zealand